Each member of this infinite family of uniform polyhedron compounds is a symmetric arrangement of prisms sharing a common axis of rotational symmetry. It arises from superimposing two copies of the corresponding prismatic compound of prisms (without rotational freedom), and rotating each copy by an equal and opposite angle.

This infinite family can be enumerated as follows:
For each positive integer n>0 and for each rational number p/q>2 (expressed with p and q coprime), there occurs the compound of 2n p/q-gonal prisms (with rotational freedom), with symmetry group Dnph.

References 
.

Polyhedral compounds